Tadeusz Lehr-Spławiński (September 20, 1891 – February 17, 1965) was a Polish linguist, scholar, and professor of Slavonic studies. He was twice elected rector of the Jagiellonian University in Kraków before and after the Nazi German occupation of Poland.

Biography
Lehr-Spławiński was born in Kraków, the son of Edward Lehr, an engineer, and Maria née Spławińska. He went to Jan III Sobieski high school and, in the years 1909–1915 studied linguistics, history of Polish literature as well as classical philology, at the Jagiellonian University in Kraków. He continued his studies in Vienna, and began his teaching career in Zakopane.

In 1918 (following Poland's return to independence), Lehr-Spławiński became professor at Poznań University and, from 1922, the University of Lwów, at both of which he led the Department of Slavonic Philology. From 1929 until his retirement in 1962, he was professor of linguistics at Jagiellonian University, elected as its Rector for the first time just prior to the Nazi German invasion of Poland. Among his students in October 1938 was the  Karol Wojtyła, the future Pope John Paul II.

World War II
On November 6, 1939, during the Sonderaktion Krakau, Lehr-Spławiński was arrested and interned by the Gestapo on the order of SS-Obersturmbannführer Bruno Müller; along with 184 professors and academics from three different universities in Kraków. It was part of a much broader assault on Polish cultural elite known as Intelligenzaktion. The prisoners were transported first to jail at Montelupich street and – some three days later – to the detention center in Breslau, where they spent 18 days in prison facilities. The Breslau Gestapo were unprepared for such a large transfer of prisoners and awaited permission to send them to the Buchenwald concentration camp. As the camp was filled to capacity, on the evening of November 27, 1939,  they were loaded on a train to the Sachsenhausen concentration camp located outside of Berlin.

Lehr-Spławiński was among a group of  Kraków academics released from custody in February 1940 as a result of an international protest involving prominent Italians including Benito Mussolini and the Vatican. Following his release, he participated in clandestine teaching during the occupation period. In 1945, after the liberation of Kraków, he again became the rector of Jagiellonian University and served until 1946. He was head of Slavonic Institute of the Polish Academy of Sciences, and Doctor honoris causa at Charles University in Prague and the Sofia University.

Lehr-Spławiński was married and had two sons, Andrzej and Wojciech and a daughter, Barbara. He died on February 17, 1965, in Kraków, and is buried at the historic Rakowicki Cemetery. A street in Kraków is named after him.

Works
Lehr-Spławiński is the author of over 400 publications in the field of linguistics and its history, etymology, Saussure's Law, as well as culture and education. He wrote dictionaries and university textbooks. Popular works by Lehr-Spławiński include: 
 Kaszubi: kultura ludowa i język (translated as The Cassubian civilization by Friedrich Lorentz), 2 editions, 1935 
 O pochodzeniu i praojczyźnie Słowian (On the origin and early homeland of the Slavs), 1946, Polish
 Język polski; pochodzenie, powstanie, rozwój, 6 editions between 1947 and 1978, Polish, English
 Przegląd i charakterystyka języków słowiańskich, 8 editions between 1954 and 1994, Polish
 Rozprawy i szkice z dziejów kultury Słowian, 1954
 Dzieje języka ukraińskiego w zarysie, 3 editions, 1956, Polish
 Wybór tekstów do historii języka rosyjskiego, 2 editions between 1965 and 1981, Russian, Polish
 Zarys gramatyki języka staro-cerkiewno-słowiańskíego na tle porównawczym, 1965
 Gramatyka historyczna języka czeskiego, in Polish, 1957 
 O mowie Polaków w Galicji Wschodniej (On the Polish language in Eastern Galicia)
 Słownik etymologiczny języka Drzewian połabskich, 3 editions, 1981, multiple languages

Footnotes

References
  Google Search inauthor:"Tadeusz Lehr-Spławiński".
  Poczet Rektorów Uniwersytetu Jagiellońskiego, (PDF: 78 KB). Retrieved May 12, 2012.

1891 births
1965 deaths
Burials at Rakowicki Cemetery
Academic staff of Jagiellonian University
Members of the Lwów Scientific Society
Linguists from Poland
Sachsenhausen concentration camp survivors
20th-century linguists